Henry Robert Dutton (16 January 1898 – 1972) was an English professional footballer who made 187 Football League appearances playing as a left half for West Bromwich Albion, Bury and Brighton & Hove Albion.

Life and career
Dutton was born in Edmonton, which was then in Middlesex. He played for Isthmian League club Tufnell Park before signing for West Bromwich Albion in 1921, but played in only 57 First Division matches in six seasons. He moved on to another First Division club, Bury, where he made 37 league appearances in two-and-a-half seasons, and then signed for Brighton & Hove Albion. At Third Division South level, he was a first-team regular, with 104 appearances in all competitions before retiring from professional football in 1933. He went on to keep a pub in Brighton, and died in Enfield in 1972.

References

1898 births
1972 deaths
Footballers from Edmonton, London
English footballers
Association football wing halves
Tufnell Park F.C. players
West Bromwich Albion F.C. players
Bury F.C. players
Brighton & Hove Albion F.C. players
Shoreham F.C. players
Isthmian League players
English Football League players